Quartal may refer to:

Quartal harmony, music featuring chords built from fourths
Quaternary numeral system, a system for representing numbers based on powers of four
 a quarter of a calendar year (e.g. Q1-4)